James R. Whelan (July 27, 1933 – December 1, 2012) was a journalist and historian who served as the first editor in chief of The Washington Times, holding the position from 1982 to 1984. He is also known as the author of several books, most of them on the recent political history of Latin America. He was born in Buffalo, New York.

Early career
Whelan began a career in journalism in 1952, much of it spent in Latin America including Chile, Venezuela, and Mexico. He started as a local correspondent for United Press International (UPI). In 1964, while UPI manager for Venezuela, he was named a Nieman Fellow. He later served as managing editor of The Miami News. He graduated from Florida International University in 1975 with a bachelor's degree. He served as vice president and editor of The Sacramento Union.

The Washington Times
In 1982 Whelan resigned from The Sacramento Union to work at the newly created Washington Times, serving as its first editor in chief and publisher. It was owned by the News World Communications, at which Whelan was later made an executive, which is affiliated with the Unification Church, although Whelan himself is not a member of the church. Whelen had initially rejected the offer to work at the new publication, but a persistent recruiting effort from Colonel Bo Hi Pak eventually changed his mind. In response to concerns over its church associations, Whelan promised the paper would be independent, citing a contract that promised autonomy. At a National Press Club luncheon in 1983, he complained about the sloppiness and hypocrisy of complaints made about the relationship with the church, stating that he himself had met the church's leader Sun Myung Moon only twice.

In 1984 Whelan unexpectedly left the paper. At a news conference, Whelan claimed that "senior members of the Unification Church Movement—the so-called Moonies—have seized direct control" of The Washington Times, and that this led to his sacking by Bo Hi Pak. Smith Hempstone, Whelan's successor, denied this, saying that a group of executives and editors, none of whom were members of the church, felt Whelan's removal would be better for the paper's "continued integrity."

Later career
After leaving the Times, Whelan worked for the Latin American News Service. He lived in Chile, serving as visiting professor at the University of Chile and writing on the nation's history. In 2008 he moved back to the United States and lived in Miami.

Death
He died of multiple organ failure at 79, at his home in Miami, Florida.

Bibliography
 Through the American Looking Glass: Central America's Crisis. Washington, D.C.: Council for Inter-American Security, 1980.
 Allende: Death of a Marxist Dream Westport, CT: Arlington House, 1981.
 Catastrophe in the Caribbean: The Failure of America's Human Rights Policy in Central America.  Ottawa, IL: Jameson Books, 1984.
 The Soviet Assault on America's Southern Flank. Washington D.C.: Regnery Gateway, 1988.
 Out of the Ashes: Life, Death and Transfiguration of Democracy in Chile, 1833-1988. Washington, D.C.: Regnery Gateway, 1989.
 Hunters in the Sky: Fighter Aces of WWII. Washington, D.C.: Regnery Gateway, 1991.

References

External links

American male journalists
1933 births
2012 deaths
The Washington Times people
Academic staff of the University of Chile